Warburton Manor was the colonial home, patented in 1661, of the Digges Family, descendants of Edward Digges, who was Governor of Virginia from 1652 to 1668. Digges was an intimate friend of George and Martha Washington, who visited the house many times. George Washington spent his forty-third birthday at Warburton Manor. Warburton Manor occupied a strategic site on the Potomac River and today it is the site of Fort Washington, designed by Pierre Charles L'Enfant in 1814.

See also
Province of Maryland

Notes
Toogood, Anna, Warburton Manor and the Digges family of Maryland, Division of History, U.S. Office of Archeology and Historic Preservation (1970)

References

External links
Historical Marker Retrieved 17 July 2018

Buildings and structures in Prince George's County, Maryland
Houses completed in the 17th century
1661 establishments in Maryland
Colonial architecture in Maryland